The 2021 Dutch Basketball Supercup was the 9th edition of the Dutch Basketball Supercup. The game was played in the Vijf Meihal in Leiden.

The game featured ZZ Leiden, the defending champions of the Dutch Basketball League, and BAL, the winners of the 2021 DBL Cup. Leiden won the game 87–74 for 500 people in its home arena.

Match details

References

Dutch Basketball Supercup
Supercup